A Tribute to Cannonball is a studio album by jazz pianist Bud Powell and tenor saxophonist Don Byas, released on Columbia in March 1979, featuring a session recorded at the Studio Charlot in Paris on 15 December 1961, with Pierre Michelot on bass and Kenny Clarke on drums, and trumpeter Idrees Sulieman guesting on four tracks. The session was produced by Cannonball Adderley, who would also produce Powell's follow-up A Portrait of Thelonious recorded two days later.

The album was digitally remastered and re-released on CD in 1997, and included a newly discovered session take of "Cherokee" with Cannonball Adderley on alto.

Track listing
"Just One of Those Things" (Cole Porter) – 5:08
"Jackie My Little Cat" (Pierre Michelot) – 4:48
"Cherokee" (Ray Noble) – 6:18
"I Remember Clifford" (Benny Golson) – 6:15
"Good Bait" (Tadd Dameron, Count Basie) – 6:30
"Jeannine" (Duke Pearson) – 5:59
"All the Things You Are" (Jerome Kern, Oscar Hammerstein II) – 7:24
"Myth" (Michelot) – 5:32
"Jackie My Little Cat" (Michelot) – 5:14
"Cherokee" [unissued alternate] [incomplete] (Noble) – 7:51 (not on original LP)

Personnel

Performance
Idrees Sulieman – trumpet (tracks 5-8 only)
Cannonball Adderley – alto sax (track 10 only)
Don Byas – tenor sax
Bud Powell – piano
Pierre Michelot – bass
Kenny Clarke – drums

Production
Cannonball Adderley – producer
Howard Fritzson – art direction
Gary Giddins – liner notes (original LP)
Orrin Keepnews – liner notes, reissue producer
Jean-Pierre Leloir – photography
Fred Scaboda – cover art
Mark Wilder – remastering

References

Bud Powell albums
1961 albums
Columbia Records albums
Tribute albums
Albums produced by Cannonball Adderley